Qatlish and Katlish may refer to:
 Qatlish-ye Olya
 Qatlish-ye Sofla